Skeptics Apocalypse is the debut album by American heavy metal band Agent Steel. It was recorded in Los Angeles, California and mastered at Frankort Wayne Studios in Miami, Florida by Tom Coyne from December 1984 to February 1985. The album was released by Combat Records in June 1985 and reissued in 1998 by Century Media Records.

The bonus tracks on the 1998 reissue contains an updated version of "(The Calling)" titled "Calling 98 for Skeptics" and the never before released song "The Unexpected" in live format, both of which are of unknown origin. The latter can be seen and heard on the Mad Locust Rising home video. A second remastered version, released in 2008, contains the two songs, plus a cover version of the Judas Priest song "The Ripper", which was originally featured on the Mad Locust Rising EP.

"144,000 Gone" and "Taken by Force" are re-recordings of songs John Cyriis had previously cut as demos with his pre-Agent Steel outfit Sceptre in 1983.  The Sceptre version of "Taken by Force" appears on Metal Massacre IV''.

Track listing

Personnel
John Cyriis – lead vocals
Juan Garcia – guitar
Kurt Colfelt – guitar
George Robb – bass
Chuck Profus – drums

Production
Jay Jones – producer
Dean "Goatie" Davis – engineering
Tom Coyne – mastering
Maarten de Boer – lacquer cut
Vickie Miellie, Teresa Trebotic – photography
Ron Breitag – logo design

References

1985 albums
Agent Steel albums
Combat Records albums